The Rivers of London series (alternatively, the Peter Grant or the PC Grant series) is a series of urban fantasy novels by English author Ben Aaronovitch, and comics/graphic novels by Aaronovitch and Andrew Cartmel, illustrated by Lee Sullivan.

Plot overview

Novels and novellas

Rivers of London 
(American title: Midnight Riot)

The novel centres on the adventures of Peter Grant, a young officer in the Metropolitan Police; who, following an unexpected encounter with a ghost, is recruited into the small branch of the Met that deals with magic and the supernatural.

Peter Grant, having become the first English apprentice wizard in over seventy years, must immediately deal with two different but ultimately inter-related cases. In one he must find what is possessing ordinary people and turning them into vicious killers, and in the second he must broker a peace between the two warring gods of the River Thames and their respective families.

Moon over Soho 

Following the events of Rivers of London Police Constable and apprentice wizard Peter Grant is called in to help investigate the brutal murder of a journalist in the downstairs toilet of the Groucho Club in London's Soho district. At the same time Peter is disturbed by a number of deaths of amateur and semi-professional jazz musicians that occurred shortly after they performed. Despite the apparently natural causes of death each body exhibits a magical signature which leads Peter to believe that the deaths are far from natural.

Whispers Under Ground 

The son of a US senator is stabbed to death, and magic involvement is suspected. An FBI agent is involved with DC Grant's case. Meanwhile, in the sewers near the tunnels of London's Underground, something is happening.

Broken Homes 

Another killer is on the loose, and the prime suspect could be an associate of the twisted magician known as the Faceless Man. A town planner goes under a tube train, and a grimoire has been stolen. And when Peter gets word of something very odd happening in Elephant and Castle, he has to investigate whether there is a connection.

Foxglove Summer 

Leaving London, Peter goes to a small village in Herefordshire, where there appears to be a supernatural element to the disappearance of two local girls. Having to cope with local cops, as well as local gods, Peter finds the mystery deepens.

The Hanging Tree 

Back in London, Peter faces the legacy of London's hangings. Investigating suspicious murders in the world of the super-rich, Peter is in a different world to the one he is used to investigating.

The Furthest Station (novella) 

In this novella, published in September 2017, Peter needs to deal with commuting ghosts, forgetful commuters, and deciphering a ghost's urgent message.

Lies Sleeping 
Published in November 2018, Peter continues the investigations into Martin Chorley.

The October Man (novella) 
Published in June 2019.  Tobias Winter, the only apprentice in the "Abteilung komplexe und diffuse Angelegenheiten" (KDA)  (Department for Complex and Diffuse Matters – the German equivalent of the Folly) investigates a suspicious death in a vineyard near the Moselle. His local colleague is Vanessa Sommer, who is going to join the KDA in the end as well.

False Value 
Peter Grant is facing fatherhood, and an uncertain future, with equal amounts of panic and enthusiasm. Rather than sit around, he takes a job with émigré Silicon Valley tech genius Terrence Skinner's new London start-up: the Serious Cybernetics Company. The book was released on 20 February 2020.

What Abigail Did That Summer (novella) 
What Abigail Did That Summer is a novella set at the same time as Foxglove Summer. In the series chronology it will be the first novella, taking place before The Furthest Station.

 Hardback: , First edition 18 March 2021
 eBook: , First edition 18 March 2021

Tales from the Folly 
Tales from the Folly, a short story collection, was published in November 2020.

Amongst Our Weapons 

This novel, the ninth in the series, was released on 7 April 2022. Peter Grant, now an expecting father, is tasked to investigate a suspicious magical death in London's silver vaults and uncover a centuries' old mystery.

Graphic novels 
The Rivers of London graphic novel series each tell a separate story arc in individual comics that when finished are collected and sold in electronic form as well as hardback and softback bound editions.

Body Work – Starting with a car on a killing spree, with no driver, Peter investigates a Bosnian refugee and a seemingly-harmless wooden bench with the darkest of paths...
 Hardback: , First edition March 2016
 Softback: , First edition March 2016
 Set between Broken Homes and Foxglove Summer
 Originally released as five monthly issues.

Night Witch - Russian Oligarch's daughter is kidnapped and he thinks kidnapping Nightwitch Varvara Sidorovna will help the situation.
 Hardback: , First edition November 2016
 Softback: , First edition December 2016
 Set between Foxglove Summer and The Hanging Tree
 Originally released as five monthly issues.

Black Mould – Sahra Guleed joins Grant in determining the source of Black Mould invading the suburbs while Nightingale takes on a haunted ice cream van.
 Hardback: , First edition June 2017
 Softback: , First edition July 2017
 Set between Night Witch and The Hanging Tree (Although the readers guide at the back of Black Mould places this story after The Hanging Tree, a brief reference is made in The Hanging Tree to the events in this story)
 Originally released as five monthly issues.

Detective Stories - Peter is trying to make Detective which is a bit complicated when your exam proctor is 90% sure you are crazy or a practical joke!
 Softback: , First edition December 2017 TBC
 Set between The Hanging Tree  and Cry Fox.
 Originally released as four monthly issues.

Cry Fox – Reynard is up to his tricks again and this time it involves some old Russian friends.
 Softback: , First edition June 2018
 Set between Detective Stories  and Water Weed.
 Originally released as four monthly issues.

Water Weed – When Chelsea and Olympia decide to earn a few quid on the side, Peter and Bev find themselves confronting London's new queenpin of crime – the brutal and beautiful Hoodette!
 Softback: , First Edition December 2018
 Originally released as four monthly issues, June 2018 – September 2018.

Action At A Distance – Nightingale searches for a serial killer in 1957 London.
 Softback: First Edition: November 2019

The Fey and the Furious – Peter investigates illegal street racing in Essex and ends up... somewhere else.
 Softback: First Edition: November 2020
 Set after the events of Lies Sleeping

Monday, Monday – A routine undercover operation leads to a Swedish werewolf.
 Softback: , First edition November 2021
 Follows on from The Fey and the Furious and is set after the events in Lies Sleeping
 Originally released as four monthly issues between July and October 2021

Future instalments 
Listed below are forthcoming titles, as confirmed on Ben Aaronovitch's blog.

Untitled Kimberley Reynolds Novella 
Following FBI Agent Kimberley Reynolds, who was introduced in Whispers Underground, and has subsequently become an ally of the Folly, this novella is set after Lies Sleeping.

Other work 
Aaronovitch has also announced several works within the same fictional universe, but set outside the chronology of the main series. These works include a short story entitled 'Cock of The Wall' focusing on Petrus Aelius Bekemetus, who Aaronovitch describes as a "temple official/Londinium wideboy" – i.e. set in Roman London which Peter Grant briefly visited in the first book of the series. Also planned is an untitled Novella focusing on Peter's mentor Thomas Nightingale.

On 1 May 2019 it was announced that a television adaptation of Rivers of London would be produced by Simon Pegg and Nick Frost's production company, Stolen Picture. However, according to Aaronovitch, the series is "still in the same state of permanent pre-pre-production".
On 7 July 2022, another TV adaptation of the book series, produced by Pure Fiction Television, See-Saw Films and Unnecessary Logo, Aaronovitch's production company, was announced.

At Dragonmeet convention in London, on 30 November 2019, it was announced that a role-playing game based on the book series would be published by Chaosium. The game was released in PDF version on 30 November 2022, pending book version.

Stories listed by internal chronology 

In a blog entry, the author has provided a list of the stories, by internal chronology.

{| class="wikitable"
|-
! Timeframe (if known)
! Story title
! Published
|-
|1957 (framing story takes place after the events of The Hanging Tree and Water Weed)
|Action at a Distance (graphic novel)
| Parts 1–4, October 2018 through January 2019, collected 12 November 2019
|-
| 1966
| Moment #1
| included in 'Tales from the Folly'
|-
|1960s 
|A Dedicated Follower of Fashion (short story)
|included in 'Tales from the Folly'
|-
| January to June 2012
| Rivers of London (novel)
| 
|-
| During the 2012 Summer Olympics
| The Home Crowd Advantage (short story)
| 'London Edition' of Rivers of London and on his official website, included in 'Tales from the Folly'
|-
| 2012
| Moment #3
|included in 'Tales from the Folly'
|-
| September to October 2012
| Moon Over Soho (novel)
| 
|-
|
|The Domestic (short story)
|Waterstones edition of Whispers Under Ground, included in 'Tales from the Folly'
|-
| December 2012
| Whispers Under Ground (novel)
| 
|-
|
|The Cockpit (short story)
|Waterstones edition of Broken Homes, included in 'Tales from the Folly'
|-
| March–April 2013
| Broken Homes (novel)
| 
|-
| Not given
|Body Work (graphic novel)
| Parts 1–5 – 16 July 2015 through 20 November 2015, collected 29 March 2016
|-
| August 2013
| Foxglove Summer (novel)
| 
|-
|
|What Abigail Did That Summer (novella)
| 18 March 2021
|-
|
|The Loneliness of the Long-Distance Granny (short story)
|Waterstones edition of Foxglove Summer, included in 'Tales from the Folly'
|-
|
|Night Witch (graphic novel)
| Parts 1–3 – 16 March 2016 through 18 May 2016, collected 1 November 2016
|-
|December 2014
|Favourite Uncle (short story)
|Waterstones edition of  Lies Sleeping, included in 'Tales from the Folly'
|-
|
|Black Mould (graphic novel)
| Parts 1–5 – 12 October 2016 through 8 March 2017, collected 25 July 2017
|-
|
|King of the Rats (short story)
|Waterstones edition of The Hanging Tree, included in 'Tales from the Folly'''
|-
| Late July 2014
| The Furthest Station (novella)
| 28 September 2017
|-
| Undisclosed month in 2014
| The Hanging Tree (novel)
| 3 November 2016 in the UK, 31 January 2017 in the US
|-
|
| A Rare Book of Cunning Device (audio book)
| Audible special edition in 2017, included in 'Tales from the Folly'
|-
|
|Detective Stories (graphic novel)
| Parts 1–4, 7 June 2017 through 3 September 2017, collected 29 December 2017
|-
| 2014
| Moment #2| included in 'Tales from the Folly'
|-
|
|Cry Fox (graphic novel)
| 8 November 2017, collected 26 June 2018
|-
|
|Water Weed (graphic novel)
| Parts 1–4, June 2018 through September 2018, collected 18 December 2018
|-
| Prologue dated 14 November 2014 Main events summer 2015, based on reference to Michelle Obama's visit to a London school (in reality, Tuesday 16th June 2015)
| Lies Sleeping (novel)
| 18 November 2018 in the UK
|-
|
| The Fey and the Furious (graphic novel)
| 25 November 2020
|-
|
| The October Man (novella)
| 31 May 2019
|-
| January 2016 
| False Value (novel)
| 20 February 2020
|-
|
|Amongst our Weapons (novel)
| April 2022
|-
|
|Cock of the Wall (short story)
| unpublished as yet
|-
|
|Monday, Monday (graphic novel)
|1 December 2021
|-
|
|Untitled Nightingale Novella
| (forthcoming)
|}

On the page where the official order is given, the author writes: "One caveat – the short story The Home Crowd Advantage is obviously set in 2012 during the London Olympics but because it was written before the chronology of the series had firmed up it contains a number of anachronisms. I've learnt to be philosophical about this sort of thing." Many of the stories give vague dates, and some of those dates conflict with the official series order (compare Foxglove Summer and The Furthest Station'').

Main characters 
 Police Constable Peter Grant; an officer in the Metropolitan Police and the first official apprentice wizard in sixty years.
 Detective Chief Inspector Thomas Nightingale; head of the Folly and the last officially sanctioned English Wizard.
 Lesley May; formerly Police Constable in the Metropolitan Police and de facto apprentice to Nightingale; now criminal associate of the Faceless Man and subject to an internal investigation
 Detective Chief Inspector Alexander Seawoll; Senior Investigation Officer at the Westminster Murder Investigation Team.
 Detective Sergeant Miriam Stephanopoulos; case officer of the Belgravia Murder Investigation Team and 'right-hand man' to DCI Seawoll
 Detective Constable Sahra Guleed; Attached to Belgravia Murder Investigation Team, often works with Peter when his cases are in London.
 Dr Abdul Haqq Walid; world-renowned gastroenterologist and cryptopathologist.
 Frank Caffrey; LFB (London Fire Brigade) Fire Investigator, ex-para and a key "associate" of the Folly.
 Professor Harold Postmartin D.Phil. FRS BMon "Postmartin the Pirate" Archivist and expert for the Folly.
 Molly; The Folly's domestic helper, of not entirely clarified species, but she has been referred to as fae-like in the PC Grant novel "Foxglove Summer".
 Abigail Kamara; an annoyingly persistent teen-aged girl who is the de facto founding member of the Folly's Youth Wing. Lives at the same estate as Peter's parents.
 Beverley Brook; "daughter" of Mama Thames and goddess of Beverley Brook, a small river in South London; in later books, Peter Grant's girlfriend.
 Cecilia Tyburn Thames; aka Lady Ty, "daughter" of Mama Thames and goddess of the River Tyburn.
 Oxley; god of the River Oxley one of the "sons" of Father Thames and his chief negotiator.
 Toby; Peter's dog, who can detect magic, indicated by barking
 Varvara Sidorovna Tamonina (aka. Varenka Dobroslova); Russian/Soviet witch (Night Witch), magical WWII veteran (365th Special Regiment of the Red Army), later living on her own in Britain with a magically extended lifetime

Reception

The Guardian's Sarah Shaffi wrote "The books have consistently featured on bestseller lists, with the most recent two novels – 2022’s ″″Amongst Our Weapons″ and 2020s ″False Value″ – going straight to No 1 on the Sunday Times bestseller list.″ She added, "Aaronovitch’s work has been translated into 14 languages and sold in excess of five million copies worldwide, and has its own wiki, Follypedia."

Reviewing the ninth book in the series, ″Amongst our Weapons″, in The Guardian, Lisa Tuttle wrote "Aaronovitch has no peers when it comes to successfully combining the appeal of a down-to-earth police procedural with all-out fantasy: here are real places, real history and real problems complicated by the existence of magic, ancient spirits, fairies, ghosts and talking foxes, all dwelling alongside ordinary, clueless humans. His plotting is still satisfyingly inventive and the continuing characters maintain their charm in the ninth novel of a series that began in 2011.

See also

 GURPS Infinite Worlds#Azoth-7, also based on the premise of Isaac Newton as a major wizard.

References 

 Peter Grant (book series)
Contemporary fantasy novel series
Fantasy novel series